Mayor Victor Timely is a fictional character appearing in American comic books published by Marvel Comics. He is a divergent version of the time traveller Nathaniel Richards, a descendant of the scientist of the same name, whose alternate selves include Pharaoh Rama-Tut, Scarlet Centurion, Kang the Conqueror, and Iron Lad / Kid Immortus. Establishing a small, quiet town called Timely, Wisconsin in 1901 to serve as a 20th-century base for his future self, becoming an industrial opponent of Henry Ford and Thomas Edison, Timely fakes his death and poses as his own son Victor Timely Jr. (and later his grandson Victor Timely III), educating Phineas Horton to eventually create the original Human Torch, eventually becoming the new Kang Prime by the time of Kang Dynasty.

The character made his feature film debut in the Marvel Cinematic Universe (MCU) film Ant-Man and the Wasp: Quantumania (2023), portrayed by Jonathan Majors, and will return in the 2023 second season of the MCU television series Loki.

Publication history
Victor Timely first appeared in The Avengers Annual #21 and was created by Peter Sanderson and Rich Yanizeski. Due to the events of The Celestial Madonna Saga, every action taken by Kang the Conqueror, Pharaoh Rama-Tut, and Immortus due to the actions of "Prime Kang" leads to each of their travels into the past creating divergent versions of themselves, all of whom seek to rule their own divergent empires and continue their own schemes, with Victor Timely diverging from the events of Avengers Forever.

Fictional character biography
At some point in his personal timeline, a humiliated divergent version of Kang decides to abandon the 21st Century and set his sights on conquering the 20th, travelling back in time to January 1, 1901 and founding the town of Timely, Wisconsin, growing a moustache and taking the new name of "Victor Timely", as the town's mayor. Building a corporate empire, Timely Industries, he builds a series of factories for common machinery ahead of Henry Ford and Thomas Edison, while instilling in his company's workers unflinching loyalty and knowledge of robotics. Subsequently, Timely uses his town to establishing the time-crossroads of Chronopolis intended to serve as city-state headquarters for all future versions of himself. Originally confined to the town itself, the fortress gradually grows out of sync with time and space into the outskirts of Limbo, becoming a crossroads between past, present, and future, where one can walk between all time periods without requiring the use of a time machine, accessible via a portal. When away in Chronopolis, Timely is replaced by robotic stand-ins remotely run by A.I. copies of himself, which would age and die over time, allowing him to fake his death and assume the mantle of his own "son", Victor Timely, Junior.

In 1929, Timely employs Phineas Horton to develop the technology to allow him to eventually create the original Human Torch by 1939, allowing Timely a secret backdoor to take control of the android. By the 1980s (modern-day; floating timeline), now presenting as his own grandson Victor Timely III, Timely Industries' technology stretches out to include the security measures behind the Baxter Building and Avengers Tower, and the robotic limbs of every cyborg in the Marvel Universe, in particular Misty Knight and Deathlok, allowing him to control their actions and eventually supplant Kang Prime with his former name, becoming the Anachronauts, his soldiers in Chronopolis, granting Timely (now Kang Prime) control over the Sentinels in Kang Dynasty.

Powers and abilities
Victor Timely has no superpowers, but he does possess a genius-level intellect and amassed an extensive knowledge of 20th Century history, allowing him to dominate the mechanical industry of the time, and build a series of robotic duplicates of himself to allow him to publicly present as ageing, hiding his immortality from the public by posing as his own sons, and allow his future selves an advantage over their adversaries.

Reception
In 2023, Comic Book Resources included Victor Timely as their fourteenth-best characterised incarnation of Kang the Conqueror.

In other media

Marvel Cinematic Universe 
 In the post-credits scene of the film Ant-Man and the Wasp: Quantumania (2023), Time Variance Authority (TVA) agents Loki and Mobius M. Mobius attend a rally held by political candidate Victor Timely (portrayed by Jonathan Majors) in 1901.
 Majors will reprise his role as Victor Timely in the second season of Loki.

Video games
 Victor Timely appears as a variant skin for Kang as a playable character in Lego Marvel Super Heroes 2 (2017), voiced by Peter Serafinowicz. with game's villain (another Kang) using specific locations in time and space (including Timely) to form Chronopolis, a myriad of 17 locations (consisting of a variation of Ancient Egypt, an apocalyptic Asgard, Attilan, Hala, the Hydra Empire, K'un-L'un, Knowhere, Lemuria, Man-Thing's Swamp, Manhattan, an alternate version of Medieval England, Manhattan Noir, Nueva York 2099, the Old West, Sakaar, Wakanda, and Xandar linked through time and space.

References

External links
 Victor Timely at Marvel.com

Comics about time travel
Comics characters introduced in 1992
Fictional characters who can manipulate time
Fictional characters with immortality
Marvel Comics male supervillains
Marvel Comics supervillains
Time travelers